The 1988–89 Harvard Crimson men's ice hockey team represented the Harvard University in college ice hockey. In its 18th year under head coach Bill Cleary the team compiled a 31–3–0 record and reached the NCAA tournament for the fourteenth time. The Crimson defeated Minnesota 4–3 in overtime to win the championship game at the St. Paul Civic Center in Saint Paul, Minnesota.

Season
After spending the previous year playing for the US National Team at the 1988 Winter Olympics, Lane MacDonald and Allen Bourbeau returned to Harvard and led a very experienced team that was looking to being the Crimson its first national championship. MacDonald was named team captain and placed on the top line along with Bourbeau and C. J. Young. Over the course of the season Harvard was led by its upper-classmen, with nearly two thirds of the game-to-game roster coming from the veterans. However, the Crimson got major contributions from underclassmen as well. Sophomores Peter Ciavaglia and Ted Donato earned their place on the second line with the former leading the team in scoring. In net Bill Cleary decided to go with a goaltending tandem with the two freshmen Allain Roy and Chuckie Hughes alternating starts.

Fast start
The Crimson began the year with five wins against different conference opponents, though none were particularly strong squads. The first real test for Harvard came against Hockey East powerhouse Boston College where the two Boston-area rivals battled into overtime where the ivy-leaguers took the game. In the three succeeding games Harvard absolutely pounded their ECAC opponents, scoring 27 goals and routing the competition. Harvard ended 1988 with a pair of games against New Hampshire teams. After an overtime win over UNH the Crimson smashed long-time rival Dartmouth 10–0, Harvard's only shutout of the season.

Number one
Harvard began the second half of its season in early January and looked to have lost a bit of a step during their three-week break; they continued to win games but their massive goal differentials had vanished. Just when it looked like they were vulnerable, however, the Crimson soundly beat previously-undefeated St. Lawrence and claimed the #1 ranking. The 15–0 Crimson were off to their best start since the depression but couldn't build on their lead for another two weeks. When they finally returned to the ice at the end of the month their offense was nowhere to be found against their arch-rival Yale and Harvard suffered its first loss of the season. The Crimson recovered for the next two games, winning easily against two of the conference's worst teams, before heading to the Boston Garden for the start of the Beanpot.

Beanpot champion
Despite Harvard's success throughout the 1980s the program hadn't won a Beanpot semifinal since 1981 and they wouldn't have an easy task in the first game as they faced Boston College who were looking for revenge after the earlier loss. Once more the squads fought a close game but Harvard was able to come out as the victor once more, setting up a championship showdown against Boston University a week later. In the meantime Harvard played a pair of road games and suffered their second loss of the season, losing in overtime to 3rd-place Colgate. The Beanpot championship came two days after the loss and Harvard's forwards ran roughshod over the Terriers, scoring nine times to win the match and give the program its ninth Beanpot title.

Harvard faced a bit of a gauntlet in the final two weeks of the regular season, going up against two of the top teams in the conference, but Harvard was able to sweep both weekends and cement its 4th-consecutive ECAC title.

ECAC tournament
Harvard began the conference tournament by hosting Rensselaer in the best-of-three quarterfinals and won two games handily. The Crimson headed back to Boston Garden for the championship rounds and found themselves in a touch match against the upstart Vermont Catamounts. They fought to a 2–2 draw after regulation and when the sixth-seed team were the ones to find the back of the net Harvard headed to its third consolation game of in four years. While they won the match against Cornell, Harvard's loss in the semifinal gave the top eastern seed to Maine despite the Crimson's 27–3 record.

NCAA tournament
The slightly lowering of their ranking still gave Harvard a first-round bye in the national tournament, allowing the Crimson to wait at home for their opponent. In late March Harvard played their final home games of the season against defending national champion Lake Superior State and the difference between the two could not have been greater. While Harvard was a fast-skating finesse team, the Lakers were a hard-nosed checking group that relied on their All-American goalie Bruce Hoffort to bail them out on the penalty kill. Harvard's goaltending tandem were able to keep LSSU from scoring much in the two games, allowing the Crimson to win both games and advance to their fourth Frozen Four of the decade.

In the semifinal Harvard faced the team that had stopped them from winning the 1986 championship in Michigan State. The senior class for MSU remembered the win over Harvard and leading-scorer Bobby Reynolds remarked:

"Thank God we're not playing Minnesota."

The relief over facing the Ivy-leaguers was soon erased when Harvard scored twice in the first while Allain Roy stood on his head to make a spectacular save on Reynolds' wrap-around chance. In the end it was the boys from the east who skated away with the victory in front of a mostly-MSU cheering 15,000.

Title Game
The championship game pitted two teams who had been desperately trying to win the title over the previous decade but came up empty each year. While Harvard wore their home whites it was Minnesota who had a sellout crowd cheering for them in their backyard of Saint Paul. Just prior to the game Lane MacDonald received the Hobey Baker Award, giving both teams a national player of the year (Robb Stauber had won the award in 1988). Both teams were anxious to win the championship and came out flying at the start of the game. Minnesota got on the board first with a fairly soft goal from the stick of Jon Anderson. In Harvard's zeal to tie up the game they took three consecutive penalties in the first period but the penalty kill, which had been good all season, stood strong and prevented Minnesota from extending its lead.

In the second in was Minnesota's turn in the box and the Gophers received three straight minors to start the middle frame. In the second power play for Harvard, Ted Donato fired a shot from the point and the puck sailed past Stauber's glove to tie the score. Four minutes later, just after the Gophers killed off the third penalty, Lane MacDonald managed to get behind Minnesota's defensemen and cut across the front of the net before beating a sprawled Stauber to give Harvard its first lead. Three and a half minutes later Minnesota finally broke through on the power play and the two teams skated into intermission tied at 2.

Minnesota had the balance of power in the third but it was Donato who found the back of the net first, giving Harvard the lead with just over 7 minutes to play. The Gophers fought furiously to tie the score and managed to do just that on their third power play of the period. In overtime Minnesota nearly won the game when a shot from Randy Skarda beat Chuckie Hughes' blocker but it hit the post square and bounced straight back. A few minutes later Harvard won a faceoff in Minnesota's end and Brian McCormack shot a puck from the point. It rebounded off of Stauber and, while Peter Ciavaglia was being tackled by Skarda, Ed Krayer picked up the puck, skated a few feet towards the corner and backhanded a puck that eluded Stauber. The overtime goal silenced the partisan crowd while the cheers from the Harvard squad echoed throughout the building.

Awards and honors
Ted Donato's two goals in the final games helped him win tournament MOP honors, and he was joined on the All-Tournament team by Kevin Sneddon, Lane MacDonald and Allain Roy. MacDonald's Hobey Baker award was the third for Harvard in a seven-year span and he was the only member of the team to make the AHCA All-American East First Team though linemate C. J. Young made the Second Team. MacDonald was also ECAC Player of the Year and an All-ECAC First Team member. Young, Allen Bourbeau and Peter Ciavaglia made second-team all-conference. As they had been equally critical to the team's success all season, it was fitting that Allain Roy and Chuckie Hughes shared the goaltending spot on the All-ECAC Rookie Team.

Head Coach Bill Cleary remained behind the bench for one more season before becoming the Athletic Director, leaving the '89 season as crowning jewel of his illustrious career.

Standings

Schedule

|-
!colspan=12 style=";" | Regular Season

|-
!colspan=12 style=";" | 

|-
!colspan=12 style=";" | 

|- align="center" bgcolor="#e0e0e0"
|colspan=12|Harvard Won Series 2-0

|-
!colspan=12 style=";" | 

|- align="center" bgcolor="#e0e0e0"
|colspan=12|Harvard Won Series 2-0

Roster and scoring statistics

Goaltending statistics

1989 championship game

(W2) Minnesota vs. (E2) Harvard

Players drafted into the NHL

1989 NHL Entry Draft

† incoming freshman

1989 NHL Supplemental Draft

See also
1989 NCAA Division I Men's Ice Hockey Tournament
List of NCAA Division I Men's Ice Hockey Tournament champions

References

Harvard Crimson men's ice hockey seasons
Harvard
Harvard
Harvard
Harvard
Harvard
Harvard